Greg Roberson is a Memphis, Tennessee-based session drummer, songwriter, producer, independent-record-label owner, and SiriusXM Radio host for Deep Tracks with Greg Roberson. The show focuses on classic rock's "lesser played songs and forgotten gems."

Outside of radio, Roberson currently operates the independent record label Trashy Creatures Records and is the drummer in Tiger High, a Memphis-based psychedelic garage-rock quartet. He also leads the bands The Trashed Romeos, Hot Freak Nation, and Her Majesty's Buzz. He is also the original drummer for Reigning Sound and still performs with the band at periodic "Memphis lineup" reunion shows.

Career 
While he is well known as a SiriusXM radio host, Roberson is also a musician and has performed and recorded with many Memphis and international recording artists. In the early 2000s, he was a founding member of the Memphis garage band Reigning Sound alongside songwriter Greg Cartwright. Roberson also performed and/or recorded with the Compulsive Gamblers, Knaughty Knights, Lover!, Arthur Lee’s Love, Jim Dickinson, Jack Oblivian & the Tennessee Tearjerkers, Ross Johnson & Jeffrey Evans, Her Majesty's Buzz, Melissa Dunn, Wreckless Eric, Phil Seymour of the Dwight Twilley Band, and others.

Over the years Roberson has been a songwriter, producer, and session musician for various projects. He currently owns and operates the independent record label Trashy Creatures Records based in Memphis. He has also led two studio side projects featuring his Tiger High bandmates: The Trashed Romeos and Hot Freak Nation.

Links 
 Greg Roberson's label, Trashy Creatures Official site
 Trashy Creatures Facebook Official Facebook site

References

 SiriusXM. Deep Tracks on SiriusXM Accessed Aug. 5, 2019
 Discogs. Albums Accessed April 27, 2016
 Memphis Flyer. Feature Accessed April 27, 2016
 All Music Guide.  Accessed April 27, 2016
 Tupica, Rich. "Turn it Down Greg Cartwright Interview 

American rock musicians
Living people
Year of birth missing (living people)